Lingamori Gudem is a village in the Inavolu mandal, Hanamkonda district of Telangana, India.

Villages in Hanamkonda district